María Isabel Granda Larco (3 September 1920 – 8 March 1983), better known as Chabuca Granda, was a Peruvian singer and composer. She created and interpreted a vast number of Criollo waltzes with Afro-Peruvian rhythms. 

Granda's "La flor de la canela", "José Antonio", "El Puente de los Suspiros", and "Fina estampa" helped the singer receive international recognition. She has influenced various Peruvian artists such as Susana Baca, Eva Ayllón, Gian Marco and Juan Diego Flórez.

In 2017, her work was declared a Cultural Heritage of the Nation and in 2019, the Peruvian government posthumously awarded her the highest national honor, the Order of the Sun.

Life and career
Granda was born on 3 September 1920, in a copper mining area in the region of Apurímac. She began singing at 12 years old, in the school choir at the exclusive girls' school Colegio Sophianum, in San Isidro, an affluent neighborhood of Lima, Peru.

At this age she sang as a soprano (an operation later gave her the deep voice for which she is remembered). However, she wasn't well known until after her divorce, a scandal in contemporary Lima, noted for  a  very conservative Catholic society.  She discovered, and was inspired by, Conny Mendez a Venezuelan composer who sang to her country and to nature. “At that time, in Peru, people mainly sang to broken hearts” she says. These are songs that never go out of fashion. The miracle of the popular song is that different countries perform it in their own way.”

Early career 
Early in her career her work was expressive and picturesque – evoking the romantic and beautiful neighborhood of Barranco in Lima, with its grand French houses with impressive entrances and winter gardens. Some of her most famous songs from this period are "Lima de veras", "La flor de la Canela", "Fina estampa", "Gracia", "José Antonio", and "Zeñó Manué", to name a few. She broke the conventional rhythmic structure of the waltz, later broke convention with her poetic cadences as well. Later in her career she wrote songs dedicated to the Chilean Violeta Parra ("Cardo o ceniza") and to Javier Heraud, a Peruvian poet and guerrillero, who was killed in 1963 by the Peruvian army.

Towards the end of her career, Chabuca Granda incorporated Afro-Peruvian rhythms into her work. Afro-Peruvian music, while popular, was not considered "high art" due to the prevalent racism and devaluation of Afro-Peruvian culture. She masterfully blended the suggestive and colorful rhythms into her work, enriching Peruvian popular music.

Death 
She died of heart problems in a clinic in Fort Lauderdale, in the United States, in 1983. Her voice and compositions are known far from the borders of her country, and her popularity has introduced the world to the fine and sensitive character of Peruvian music.

Legacy 
Granda continued to make her presence felt a decade after her death, when Caetano Veloso used her song, "Fina estampa", as the title track of an album released in 1994, while her song, "Maria Lando", written with César Calvo, provided the North American breakthrough for Peruvian vocalist Susana Baca the following year.

Granda's song "La Flor de la Canela" has become an anthem for the city of Lima, since it was made popular by the Peruvian group Los Chamas in 1952. Granda worked with several influential guitarists including Oscar Avilés, Lucho Garland, Lucho González, Alvaro Lagos, and Felix Casaverde.

In 2021, the Central Reserve Bank of Perú honored Granda by featuring her on the country's 10 Peruvian sol banknote, in honor of Granda's legacy and in recognition of the country's bicentennial.

Discography
 Fina estampa (criollo waltz)
 La flor de la canela (criollo waltz)]
 El puente de los suspiros
 Cardo o ceniza (landó)
 José Antonio (criollo waltz)
 Lima de veras (criolla waltz)
 
 María Landó (landó)
 Ha de llegar mi Dueño (Tondero

External links

  Biography of Chabuca Granda
  Another biography
  Chabuca Granda in 300 Millones

Peruvian composers
20th-century Peruvian women singers
20th-century Peruvian singers
Peruvian people of Italian descent
Peruvian people of English descent
Peruvian people of Basque descent
Peruvian people of Spanish descent
Peruvian singer-songwriters
1920 births
1983 deaths
Latin music songwriters
Women in Latin music